Mount Haven may refer to:
 Haven Mountain, a mountain in Oates Land, Antarctica
 Mount Haven Hotel, a hotel in Marazion, Cornwall, England, UK

See also
 Haven (disambiguation)
 Haven Hill, a hill in Ross Dependency, Antarctica